James Lemen Sr. (November 10, 1760 – January 8, 1823) was an American justice of the peace and minister who was a leader of the anti-slavery movement in Indiana Territory in the early nineteenth century.

Born near Harper's Ferry, Virginia (now in West Virginia) or in Lexington, Virginia, in colonial times, he served a two-year enlistment in the American Revolutionary War. He graduated from Washington and Lee University in 1776. He married Catherine Ogle, from the family whose name is perpetuated in that of Ogle County, Illinois. Lemen was a protégé of Thomas Jefferson.

Most historians believe there was a "Jefferson-Lemen Secret Anti-Slavery Compact," whereby Jefferson secretly asked Lemen to move to Illinois (then Indiana Territory), and to take up the anti-slavery cause there.

Lemen became a leader of the anti-slavery movement in Indiana Territory, and influenced the Illinois' first "Free State" Constitution, which was framed in 1818 and preserved in 1824.

He died in New Design, Illinois on January 8, 1823 at the age of 62. Lemen founded New Design.

In a letter to Lemen's son, Rev. James Lemen Jr., dated March 2, 1857, Abraham Lincoln praises Lemen senior's anti-slavery work. Lemen, as Jefferson's agent in Illinois, founded the anti-slavery churches, which in Lincoln's view, "set in motion the forces which finally made Illinois a free state."

Lemen’s son Rev. James Lemen Jr. (Oct. 18, 1787 in New Design, Illinois - Feb. 8, 1870 in Chicago, Illinois) was a nationally known preacher and politician. Lemen graduated from Columbia University in 1806. He served as a Representative for Illinois for over 20 years and was offered the position of a Senator from the Governor of Illinois, but he declined the offer. James Lemen was a mentor to future president Abraham Lincoln.

His great-great-grandson William Rainey Harper was the founder and first president of the University of Chicago. His great-granddaughter Mary Reed was married to Illinois Representative and Speaker of the House Joseph Gurney Cannon.

See also
History of slavery in Indiana

Notes

Indiana Territory officials
Delegates to the 1816 Indiana constitutional convention
People from Harpers Ferry, West Virginia
1823 deaths
1760 births
American justices of the peace